Juan Manuel Muñoz Díaz (born 19 May 1969) is a Spanish dressage rider. He represented Spain at the 2012 Summer Olympics in team and individual dressage. As of 2013, Díaz no longer competes in dressage.

References

Living people
1969 births
Spanish male equestrians
Spanish dressage riders
Olympic equestrians of Spain
Equestrians at the 2008 Summer Olympics
Equestrians at the 2012 Summer Olympics